Martin Kriška (born August 5, 1984) is a Slovak professional ice hockey right winger currently playing for MHK 32 Liptovský Mikuláš of the Slovak Extraliga.

Kriška previously played the majority of his career with his hometown team MHK 32 Liptovský Mikuláš, where he played a total of 552 games. He also played for HC Košice and MHC Martin as well as for Arlan Kokshetau of the Kazakhstan Hockey Championship where he spent four seasons.

He returned to Liptovský Mikuláš in 2016 and was named captain in 2018. On January 31, 2020, Kriška joined HC '05 Banská Bystrica on loan for the remainder of the season in pursuit of a championship though the season would be prematurely curtailed due to the COVID-19 pandemic. He would then sign for the team permanently on August 2, 2020.

References

External links

 

1984 births
Living people
Slovak ice hockey right wingers
Sportspeople from Liptovský Mikuláš
MHk 32 Liptovský Mikuláš players
HC Košice players
MHC Martin players
Arlan Kokshetau players
HC '05 Banská Bystrica players
Expatriate ice hockey players in Kazakhstan
Slovak expatriate ice hockey people
Slovak expatriate sportspeople in Kazakhstan